Uvinsky District (Uva joros) is an administrative and municipal district (raion), one of the twenty-five in the Udmurt Republic, Russia. It is located in the southwestern central part of the republic. Its administrative center is the rural locality (a settlement) of Uva. Population:  40,738 (2002 Census);  The population of Uva accounts for 50.4% of the district's total population.

References

Sources

Districts of Udmurtia